Knut Holmann (born 31 July 1968, in Oslo) is a Norwegian sprint canoeist competed from the early 1990s to the early 2000s (decade). Competing in four Summer Olympics, he won six medals. This included three golds (K-1 500 m: 2000, K-1 1000 m: 1996, 2000), two silvers (K-1 500 m: 1996, K-1 1000 m: 1992), and one bronze (K-1 500 m: 1992).

Holmann also won thirteen ICF Canoe Sprint World Championships with four golds (K-1 1000 m: 1990, 1991, 1993, 1995), five silvers (K-1 500 m: 1991, 1995; K-1 1000 m: 1998, 1999; K-1 10000 m: 1993), and four bronzes (K-1 500 m: 1994, K-1 1000 m: 1994, 1997; K-4 200 m: 1998).

References

1968 births
Canoeists at the 1988 Summer Olympics
Canoeists at the 1992 Summer Olympics
Canoeists at the 1996 Summer Olympics
Canoeists at the 2000 Summer Olympics
Living people
Norwegian male canoeists
Olympic canoeists of Norway
Olympic gold medalists for Norway
Sportspeople from Oslo
Olympic medalists in canoeing
ICF Canoe Sprint World Championships medalists in kayak
Medalists at the 2000 Summer Olympics
Medalists at the 1996 Summer Olympics
Medalists at the 1992 Summer Olympics
Olympic silver medalists for Norway
Olympic bronze medalists for Norway